As of October 2015, German low-cost carrier Germanwings served the following destinations. During 2016, the network had been incorporated into Eurowings.

Destinations

References

Annotations

External links
Germanwings

Lists of airline destinations